Joan Baez, Vol. 2 is the second studio album by Joan Baez.  Released in 1961, the album, like her self-titled 1960 debut album, featured mostly traditional songs. The bluegrass band The Greenbriar Boys provided backup on two songs. 
Joan Baez, Vol. 2 peaked at #13 on the Billboard album chart and was nominated for a Grammy for "Best Contemporary Folk Performance".

The Vanguard reissue contains three unreleased tracks, "I Once Loved A Boy", "Poor Boy" and "Longest Train I Ever Saw".

Reception 

In his Allmusic review, music critic Matt Fink wrote of the album: "The material chosen is truly exceptional... Without a doubt, Baez's version of "Pal of Mine" is every bit as vibrant as when the Carters recorded it, though here given a more bluegrass sound by the banjo and backup vocal accompaniment of the Greenbriar Boys. Baez is a true master of her craft, and though she hasn't always made the best choices for material, the 14 interpretations here are as timeless as the songs themselves... this is an album that all fans of traditional folk music should seek out."

Track listing

All songs traditional, except where noted.

Personnel
Joan Baez – vocals, guitar
The Greenbriar Boys – vocals, accompaniment (tracks B1-B2)

Certifications

References

1961 albums
Joan Baez albums
Albums produced by Maynard Solomon
Vanguard Records albums